The 2017 Sacramento State Hornets football team represented California State University, Sacramento as a member of the Big Sky Conference during the 2017 NCAA Division I FCS football season. Led by fourth-year head coach Jody Sears, Sacramento State compiled an overall record of 7–4 with a mark of 6–2 in conference play, placing in a three-way tie for third in the Big Sky. The Hornets played home games at Hornet Stadium in Sacramento, California.

Schedule

Despite Weber State also being a member of the Big Sky Conference, the September 16 game against Sacramento State was considered a non-conference game.

Game summaries

at Idaho

Incarnate Word

Weber State

Southern Utah

at Eastern Washington

Idaho State

at North Dakota

at Northern Arizona

Northern Colorado

at Cal Poly

UC Davis

References

Sacramento State
Sacramento State Hornets football seasons
Sacramento State Hornets football